Larry Thomas may refer to:
Larry Thomas (actor) (born 1956), American actor best known for portraying "The Soup Nazi" on the NBC sitcom Seinfeld
Larry Thomas (baseball) (born 1969), baseball player
Larry D. Thomas (born 1947), Texas poet laureate
Larry Thomas (racing driver) (1936–1965), NASCAR driver
Larry Thomas (political advisor) (c. 1948–2018), American politician advisor
Larry Thomas (basketball) (born 1993), basketball player

See also
Lawrence Thomas (disambiguation)